"Serial Thriller" is a 2006 song by written by Christina Amphlett and performed by Australian singer Brielle Davis. It may also refer to:

 Ednör – L'Attaque, a roller coaster that was named Serial Thriller when it was located at Six Flags AstroWorld
 Thunderhawk (Michigan's Adventure), a roller coaster that was named Serial Thriller when it was located at Geauga Lake

See also
 Serial Killer (disambiguation)